Libertas Institute may refer to:
 Libertas Institute (Utah)
 Libertas Institute (Ireland)